Sitting Targets is the tenth studio album by Peter Hammill, released on Virgin Records in June 1981.  It contains several songs in the raw new wave style typical of Hammill's work in the late 1970s and early 1980s, following the dissolution of his band Van der Graaf Generator, and one of his occasional tender ballads, "Ophelia".   "Stranger Still", "Sign" and "Central Hotel" have all been regularly performed by Hammill live in recent years.

"Ophelia" was re-worked for Hammill's 1984 album The Love Songs.

Artwork 

The cover features crash test dummies in photographs supplied by the Ford Motor Company.

Track listing

Personnel 

Peter Hammill - vocals, guitar, keyboards
Guy Evans - drums (tracks: 1,2,6,7,9)
David Jackson - saxophone, flute (tracks: 4,6,7,11)
Morris Pert - percussion (tracks: 4,7,10)
Phil Harrison - synthesisers (tracks: 3,8,9)

Technical 
Peter Hammill - recording engineer (Sofa Sound, Wiltshire)
David Lord - mixing (Crescent Studios, Bath)
Rocking Russian - design
Ford Motor Company - photography

References

External links 
Notes from an unofficial Peter Hammill website

Peter Hammill albums
1981 albums
Virgin Records albums